FJD  may refer to:
 Democratic Youth Front, a Peruvian political group
 Democratic Youth Front (Nicaragua), the youth organization of the Independent Liberal Party
 Fijian dollar by ISO 4217 currency code
 Justice and Development Front, an Algerian political party